Carpronium chloride (INN) is a hair growth reagent with a vasodilatory action.

References

Human hair
Vasodilators